Once Upon a Mirage (細圈仔) is a 1982 Hong Kong film directed by Patrick Lung Kong.

Cast
 Wong Yee-Ching - Li Chu Chu
 Cheung Ga-Wai - Sharky
 Lau Shing-Yip - Li Hsiang Yang
 Roy Chiao - Policeman Ma
 Liu Wai-hung - Lu Yik Nien
  - Catty Li
 Patrick Lung Kong	 	 
 David Lo Dai-Wai - Master Lung's dad
 Choi Gwok-Hing - Uncivil man in toilet
 Chris Lee Kin-Sang - Li Kang
 Dorothy Yu Yee-Ha - Chang Ai Hsia
 Hui Kin-Seun	 	 
 Yeung Yau-Cheung - Massage customer

Awards
Lillian Lee Pik-Wah was nominated for Best Screenplay for at Once Upon a Mirage the 2nd Hong Kong Film Awards.

External links
 IMDb entry
 HK Cinemagic entry
 HKMDB entry
 Film review

Hong Kong drama films
1980s Hong Kong films